The Anaconda Copper Mine was a large copper mine in Butte, Montana that closed operations in 1947 and  was eventually consumed by the Berkeley Pit, a vast open-pit mine. Originally a silver mine, it was bought for $30,000 in 1881 by an Irish immigrant named Marcus Daly from Michael Hickey, a Civil War veteran, and co-owner Charles X. Larabie. From this beginning Daly, along with partners George Hearst, James Ben Ali Haggin and Lloyd Tevis, created the Anaconda Copper Mining Company, which ultimately became a global mining enterprise that would go on to mine 18 billion pounds of copper over 100 years. At the height of The Anaconda Copper Mining Company, it consisted of the Anaconda and other Butte mines, a smelter at Anaconda, Montana, processing plants in Great Falls, Montana, the American Brass Company, and many other properties spanning multiple countries. 

The Anaconda Copper Mining Company was acquired by ARCO in 1977.

F. Augustus Heinze, an investor who had come to Montana to capitalize on the mining industry, used the apex theory in several lawsuits to lay claim to ore from the Anaconda Mines. Heinze purchased a small parcel of unclaimed land on top of Butte Hill. In actions upheld by several Butte judges, he was able to take copper ore that was in the Anaconda company's shafts. After years of losing lawsuits to Heinze, the company shut down all operations in the state. They put nearly 80% of the state workforce out of work in order to force the state legislature to adopt a "change of venue" provision for lawsuits. Eventually, the company bought out all of Heinze's properties and claims.

See also 
 Anaconda Road Massacre
 Butte, Anaconda and Pacific Railway

References 

 Malone, Michael P. The Battle for Butte: Mining and Politics on the Northern Frontier, 1864-1906 (1981), the most detailed scholarly history

Further reading 
 Bakken, Gordon Morris. "Anaconda and the Price of Pollution," The Historian Volume: 69#1 (2007). pp 36+ online edition, short scholarly history
 Marcosson, Isaac F. Anaconda (1957), official company history
  Mihelich, John Anthony. "The Richest Hill on Earth: An Ethnographic Account of Industrial Capitalism, Religion, and Community in Butte, Montana, 1930-1965," (Ph.D. Dissertation, Washington State U. 1999;  337 pp) Dissertation Abstracts International, 2000, Vol. 60 Issue 11, pp 4073–4073
 Quivik, Frederic L. "Smoke and Tailings: An Environmental History of Copper Smelting Technologies in Montana, 1880-1930" (Ph.D. dissertation, University of Pennsylvania, 1998).

External links 

 Carleton Watkins, Interior Views of Anaconda Mines (Butte, MT)
 "Montana Mosaic: The Rise and Fall of the Anaconda Copper Mining Company" (2006),  Documentary produced by Montana PBS

All of the following are filed under Butte, Silver Bow County, MT:
 
 
 
 
 
 
 
 
 
 

Mines in Montana
Copper mines in the United States
Anaconda Copper
Buildings and structures in Silver Bow County, Montana
Historic American Engineering Record in Montana
Underground mines in the United States
1881 establishments in Montana Territory